Jung Dong-hwan (born  August 5, 1949) is a South Korean actor. Jung began his career in theater, then was most active in Korean cinema in the 1980s, with leading roles in Late Autumn (1982), Jung-kwang's Nonsense (1986), and A Top Knot on Montmartre (1987). As he grew older, Jung appeared more frequently in television, notably in The Last Station (1987), Three Kim Generation (1998), Winter Sonata (2002), Rustic Period (2002), Immortal Admiral Yi Sun-sin (2004) and Freedom Fighter, Lee Hoe-young (2010).

Early years and education 
Jung was born in Gimje, as second and youngest son. He spent his childhood in Huam-dong, Seoul with his mother and his older brother.

Since he was young, Jung enjoyed watching plays. At that time, there weren't as many theatre performances as now, he was seeing only one or two plays a year. Jung decided to enrol , that had the best theater club. He was lucky to be the main character from the first grade. His first play was When Dawn Breaks by Irish playwright Augusta Gregory.

In 1965, when he was a freshman in high school, when he participated in the National Drama Contest with a play called 'Sunrise' and he won the Best Acting Award. The competition's host was Dongnang  (1905-1974).

After failed his college entrance exam, Jung decided to enter  the Seoul Academy of Dramatic Arts, founded by Dongnang . which was predecessor of today Department of Theater and Film of Seoul Institute of the Arts. Yoo gave Jung a full scholarship on the condition that he work as a stage manager in Dongnang Repertoire Theater Company. As soon as he entered, young elite theatrical figures of the time, such as Yoo Deok-hyung, Ahn Min-soo, and Yoo Min-young, returned from studying abroad. Meeting them and getting to know a new theater culture was a big turning point in his life. He also met and learned from senior actor Lee Ho-jae and Jeon Moo-song.

Career

Early Career 
He debuted professionally in the play "Stranger" in 1969. Jung scholarship was changed to a partial scholarship. Having hard time to pay for tuition, in early 1970s, Jung enlisted in the military before finishing school and left for Vietnam War. Normally, the enlistment duration was for 12 months, but Jung had to stay for 18 months because the military was on the verge of defeat. He was discharged from the military and came back in 1973. Although he had some money from Vietnam, he did not go back to school due to his family's difficult circumstances, making a living was more urgent. As soon as he returned from Vietnam, he took the 6th Dong-A Broadcasting Voice Actor Test and passed with 1000:1 competition ratio.

He only worked as voice actor for one and half year. After quitting his job at Dong-A Broadcasting, Jung went to Okinawa the following fall to work as a sugarcane farm worker. After working for a few months and making some money, he returned to Korea. In 1975, He was acted as Prince in play Prince of the Horse. The play was a box office hit and confirmed his presence as an actor. However He still can’t make a living only from theater. Jung recalled his manual labour in Okinawa,"The hourly wage was about the daily rate in Korea at the time, but I lived on the theater stage with the money I earned there, and when the money ran out, I went out again."

Screen debut, study abroad 
In 1978, Jung debuted in small screen with KBS drama Wild Geese. He earned Baeksang Award for New actor. 

In 1981, he starred alongside Kim Hye-ja in director Kim Soo-yong's film , which was released in 1982. Then in 1982, he flew to the United States to study acting at the Lee Strasberg Theatre and Film Institute, Los Angeles. To make a living he worked as cleaning service and cleaned buildings at night. In March 1985, He returned to small screen with TV Novel: The Sky at Daybreak. Followed by film Jung-kwang's Nonsense (1986), and A Top Knot on Montmartre (1987). Since then, Jung have been living without a break, going back and forth between TV, movies and plays.

He first played Vladimir in Samuel Beckett’s play Waiting for Godot in 1990. Although he was 41 years old, the pronoun of drama script was difficult. In October of that year, he performed the play in Beckett’s hometown of Dublin, Ireland. The local media The Irish Times published an article on the top right of the front page, saying, The altitude from the East was worth the wait.

Jung appeared more frequently in television, notably in The Last Station (1987), Three Kim Generation (1998), Winter Sonata (2002), Rustic Period (2002). In 2003 Jung acted the role of Edward Damson, famous English playwright, in the Korean premiere of Peter Shaffer's The Gift of the Gorgon.

Immortal Admiral Yi Sun-sin (2004) and Freedom Fighter, Lee Hoe-young (2010).

In June 2009, Jung reprise the role of Edward Damson, famous English playwright, in the Korean encore of Peter Shaffer's The Gift of the Gorgon. His intellectual wife, Helen, was played by Seo Yi-sook. It was performed from the 10th to the 21st at the Arko Arts Theatre in Daehak-ro, Seoul.

In 2013, Jeong played the role of poet Virgilius in Dante's Divine Comedy a play performed for the first time in Korea, at the Namsan National Theater on the 29th.

In 2015, for the first time in 25 years, Jeong met the audience again as Vladimir. He, Ahn Seok-hwan, Kim Myung-guk, Lee Ho-sung, and 13 famous actors who have gone through this work have come together. It is a place to commemorate the 45th anniversary of the premiere of play Waiting for Godot directed by Sanullim Theatre Company and the 30th anniversary of the opening of the small theatre Sanullim. Despite 50 years of acting skills, he has been in the practice room almost every day since the beginning of January.

In 2017, Jung appeared in the play The Brothers Karamazov, based a novel by Fyodor Dostoevsky. It became a hot topic with a total running time of 7 hours, and received a standing ovation from the audience for 20 minutes without a break. He said, "I wasn’t confident every day if I could finish the performance properly and come down. I thought I didn’t know when and what would happen from day to the end, but I believed that it was something I had to do to try until the end."

In 2019, Jang acted as Noh Joon-suk, in tvN fantasy drama Hotel del Luna, as hotel's general manager for 30 years. He considers Man-wol (played by Lee Ji-eun) as a sister, daughter and friend. Jung won Lifetime Achievement Award at 12th Korea Drama Awards for his role.

In 2021, Jung joined special performance of play The Brothers Karamazov to celebrate Dostoyevsky's 200th birthday. Also in 2021, Jung acted as Simeon Cheney in Pascal Quignard's first play In the Garden We Loved, winner of the 2018 Deauville 'Book and Music Award', based on the novel with the same name.

Personal life 
Jung divorced his ex-wife in 1982. Then in the same year, he flew to the United States to study acting at the 'Lee Strasburg Theater Institute', Los Angeles. In 1985, he met singer Jeong Yun-seon, through a friend. Jeong was former 70s singer who retired in the United States after her manager died from leukemia. The two hold engagemet ceremony at Palace Hotel on February 12, 1986, and got married in September of the same year. Their wedding was officiated by playwright . They have one son and two daughters, their second daughter Jung Ha-nui is active as a theater actress.

In 2014, Jung revealed on Woman Chosun Interview that he had panic disorder.

Filmography

Film

Television series

Variety show

Theater

Awards and nominations

Notes

References

External links 

 
 
 
 

1949 births
Living people
People from Gimje
South Korean male television actors
South Korean male film actors
South Korean male stage actors
South Korean male musical theatre actors
Seoul Institute of the Arts alumni
20th-century South Korean male actors
21st-century South Korean male actors
Best Actor Paeksang Arts Award (theatre) winners
Best New Actor Paeksang Arts Award (television) winners